Coleophora curvirostra is a moth of the family Coleophoridae.

References

curvirostra
Moths described in 1997